WRBE-FM (106.9 FM) is a radio station licensed to serve the community of Lucedale, Mississippi. The station is owned by JDL Corporation, and airs a country music format.

The station was assigned the WRBE-FM call letters by the Federal Communications Commission on October 17, 1990.

References

External links
 Official Website
 FCC Public Inspection File for WRBE-FM
 

RBE-FM
Radio stations established in 1993
1993 establishments in Mississippi
Country radio stations in the United States
George County, Mississippi